Epinotia nigristriana is a moth of the family Tortricidae. It is found in south-western Bulgaria and Greece. The habitat consists of dry, rocky steppes.

References

Moths described in 2011
Eucosmini
Moths of Europe